William Sidney Murphy (1868 – 23 October 1930) was a newspaper proprietor and member of the Queensland Legislative Assembly.

Early days
Murphy was born at Mudgee, New South Wales, to Edward Murphy and his wife Eliza (née Drane) and was educated in Mudgee and Sydney. By 1890 he was working as an editor for the Croydon Mining News and from 1892 until 1929 he was the proprietor.

Political career
Following the death of Billy Browne in 1904, Murphy was elected to the Queensland Legislative Assembly as the member for Croydon. He lost the seat at the 1907 state election to the Opposition Party's Vince Creagh but at the 1908 state election he defeated Creagh to regain the seat.

Murphy was the member for Croydon until 1912 when the seat was abolished. He subsequently won the seat of Burke and remained its member until he was defeated by Darby Riordan in 1918.

Although he started his political career representing the Labour Party, Murphy joined the Kidstonites in early 1908 for several months and then served the rest of his political career as an independent member of parliament. In 1910 he was a member of the Royal Commission into the health of miners.

Personal life
Murphy died in Strathfield in 1930. His funeral moved from Cross Street, Strathfield, to the Rookwood Cemetery.

References

 

Members of the Queensland Legislative Assembly
1868 births
1930 deaths